Inna Yakovlevna Stepanova (born 17 April 1990) is a Russian archer of Buryat ethnicity. Stepanova is a student of Physical Education at Buryat State University.

Career
At the 2012 Summer Olympics she competed for her country in the Women's team event, reaching the semifinals in the women's team event where her team lost to China 207 to 208, and then lost the bronze medal match 207 to 209 to Japan. She placed 17th in the ranking round of the women's individual archery competition.

At the 2016 Summer Olympics Inna Stepanova won the silver medal in the team competition, with Tuyana Dashidorzhiyeva and Kseniya Perova.  She placed 9th in the individual event.

References

External links
 
 

Russian female archers
1990 births
Living people
People from Ulan-Ude
Olympic archers of Russia
Archers at the 2012 Summer Olympics
Archers at the 2016 Summer Olympics
Buryat sportspeople
Archers at the 2015 European Games
European Games competitors for Russia
World Archery Championships medalists
Olympic medalists in archery
Olympic silver medalists for Russia
Medalists at the 2016 Summer Olympics
Universiade medalists in archery
Buryat State University alumni
Universiade bronze medalists for Russia
Archers at the 2019 European Games
Medalists at the 2015 Summer Universiade
Sportspeople from Buryatia